James Nuttall (7 July 1899 – 1945) was an English footballer who played for Manchester United and Bolton Wanderers and was later captain of Rochdale when they joined the English Football League in 1921.

References

Rochdale A.F.C. players
Manchester United F.C. players
Bolton Wanderers F.C. players
Chorley F.C. players
English footballers
Footballers from Bolton
Association football defenders
1899 births
1945 deaths